The 2009 season is the 23rd season played by the United Soccer Leagues.  Season titles will be contested by 20 professional men's clubs in the USL First Division and USL Second Division, as well as 37 professional and amateur women's clubs in the W-League and 68 professional and amateur men's teams in the USL Premier Development League.

The First Division season kicked off on April 11 with the US Open Cup finalist Charleston Battery and host defending champions Vancouver Whitecaps FC playing to a scoreless tie, while the Carolina RailHawks defeated the visiting Minnesota Thunder 2–1. The season ended on September 20 with the Charleston Battery defeating hosts Minnesota Thunder 3–2. As a change for this season, the Finals will follow the rest of the playoffs in being two legs. The playoffs started on September 24, and ended on October 17 with the Montreal Impact defeating Vancouver Whitecaps FC on a 6–3 aggregate score.

The Second Division season started on April 17 with the Pittsburgh Riverhounds and host Crystal Palace Baltimore playing to a scoreless tie. The regular season ended on August 15 with three games. The Richmond Kickers captured the title in the playoffs with a 3–1 win over the Charlotte Eagles on August 29.

General
 Changes in the First Division: the Cleveland City Stars were promoted from Second Division and the Austin Aztex were added as an expansion team.  The Atlanta Silverbacks went on hiatus for the season, and the Seattle Sounders were replaced by an expansion MLS team.
 Changes in the Second Division: the Cleveland City Stars were promoted to the First Division.
 In the PDL, 9 teams withdrew for the 2009 season, while 10 expansion teams increase the league to 68 teams in 8 divisions across 4 conferences.  Teams play a 16-game league schedule.
 In the W-League, 6 teams withdrew for the 2009 season, while 2 expansion teams were added, leaving the league at 37 members.  Sky Blue and Washington Freedom were given WPS teams, with Washington playing their reserves in the W-League and Sky Blue selling their W-League team.

Honors

First Division

Regular season

Standings

Results

Playoffs
Teams will be re-seeded for semifinal matchups.

Quarterfinals

Puerto Rico Islanders won 5–3 on aggregate.

Montreal Impact won 4–1 on aggregate.

Vancouver Whitecaps won 1–0 on aggregate.

Semifinals

Montreal Impact won 4–2 on aggregate.

Vancouver Whitecaps won 5–4 on aggregate.

Finals

Montreal Impact won 6–3 on aggregate.

Awards and All-League teams
First Team
F: Charles Gbeke (Vancouver Whitecaps) (Leading Goalscorer); Keita Mandjou (Portland Timbers); Johnny Menyongar (Rochester Rhinos)
M: Daniel Paladini (Carolina RailHawks); Ryan Pore (Portland Timbers); Ricardo Sánchez (Minnesota Thunder)
D: Nelson Akwari (Charleston Battery); Cristian Arrieta (Puerto Rico Islanders) (MVP & Defender of the Year); Matt Bobo  (Charleston Battery); David Hayes (Portland Timbers)
G: Steve Cronin (Portland Timbers) (Goalkeeper of the Year)
Coach: Gavin Wilkinson (Portland Timbers) (Coach of the Year)

Second Team
F: Marlon James (Vancouver Whitecaps); Eddie Johnson (Austin Aztex)
M: Martin Nash (Vancouver Whitecaps); Lawrence Olum (Minnesota Thunder); Jonathan Steele (Puerto Rico Islanders); David Testo (Montreal Impact)
D: Stephen DeRoux (Montreal Impact); Cameron Knowles (Portland Timbers); John Krause (Puerto Rico Islanders); Mark Schulte (Carolina RailHawks)
G: Bill Gaudette (Puerto Rico Islanders)

Second Division

Regular season

Standings

Results

Playoffs

First round

Semifinals

Final

Awards and All-League team
First Team
F: Matthew Delicâte (Richmond Kickers), Jamie Watson (WIL) (MVP)
M: Ty Shipalane (HAR), Kenny Bundy (WIL), Mike Burke (RIC), Jorge Herrera (CHA)
D: Dustin Bixler (HAR), John Borrajo (RMD), Shintaro Harada (CPB), Yomby William (RIC) (Defender of the Year)
G: Ronnie Pascale (RIC) (Goalkeeper of the Year)
Coach: David Irving (WIL)
Rookie of the Year: Ty Shipalane, HAR

Second Team
F: Almir Barbosa (WMA), Damico Coddington (BER), Chad Severs (HAR)
M: Justin Evans (PIT), Jamie Franks (WIL), Amaury Nunes (CHA), Val Teixeira (CPB)
D: Colin Falvey (WIL), Sascha Gorres (RIC), Andrew Marshall (CPB)
G: Chase Harrison (HAR)

Premier Development League

W-League

References

External links
Official USL Site

 
2
2009
2009
United